Malcolm Kenyatta (born July 30, 1990) is an American politician from North Philadelphia, Pennsylvania. A member of the Democratic Party, he has served as the Pennsylvania State Representative for the 181st district since 2019.

Early life and education 
Kenyatta was born to Kelly Kenyatta and Malcolm J. Kenyatta, at Temple University Hospital in North Central Philadelphia. He has three adopted siblings. Kenyatta is the grandson of the civil rights activist Muhammad I. Kenyatta.

Kenyatta earned a Bachelor of Arts degree in strategic communication from Temple University and a Master of Science in public communication from Drexel University. During college, Kenyatta organized student protests against proposed education budget cuts by then-Governor Tom Corbett.

During college, Kenyatta was also an avid poet and performer. In 2008, with the help of theater professor Kimmika Williams-Witherspoon, he founded the award-winning poetry collective Babel, which has twice won the College Unions Poetry Slam Invitational.

Kenyatta completed Harvard University's John F. Kennedy School of Government program for Senior Executives in State and Local Government as a David Bohnett Fellow.

Career 
Kenyatta has been engaged in community affairs and politics since he was eleven years old, serving as the junior block captain with the Philadelphia Streets program.

Kenyatta has worked as a community activist, specifically around issues of poverty, which he has called "the moral and economic issue of our generation." He worked as a political consultant on multiple state and local races, most notably as the campaign manager for lawyer and activist Sherrie Cohen, the daughter of longtime city councilman David Cohen, in her 2015 bid for the Philadelphia City Council.

Kenyatta backed Joe Biden in the 2020 Democratic presidential primaries and has been critical of Bernie Sanders. He does not support an immediate transition to Medicare for All, noting that he would support interim bipartisan measures instead.
Kenyatta supports abolishing the United States Senate filibuster.

In 2016 and 2020, he was elected as a delegate to the Democratic National Convention. He was selected as one of seventeen speakers to jointly deliver the keynote address at the 2020 Democratic National Convention. This made him, Sam Park, and Robert Garcia the first openly-gay speakers in a keynote slot at a Democratic National Convention.

Kenyatta was one of 20 electors selected by the Pennsylvania Democratic Party to vote in the Electoral College for Joe Biden and his running mate Kamala Harris in 2020 United States presidential election.

Pennsylvania House of Representatives 
In December 2017, Kenyatta announced his campaign for the Pennsylvania House of Representatives to replace the long-serving incumbent Curtis Thomas. He won a five-way Democratic party primary election in May 2018 with 42.1% of the vote. The night of the election, unidentified people set up homophobic posters of him and his ex-husband throughout the district.

Kenyatta won the general election in November against Republican opponent Milton Street with 95.3% of the vote. The win made him one of the youngest elected State Representatives in the Commonwealth of Pennsylvania and the first openly-LGBTQ person of color elected to either chamber of the Pennsylvania General Assembly in the state's history.

Despite running in the 2022 Democratic primary for U.S. Senate, Kenyatta also remained on the primary ballot for re-election to 181st district, for which he ran unopposed in both the primary and general elections.

2022 United States Senate campaign 

On February 18, 2021, Kenyatta announced his bid for the United States Senate in the 2022 Democratic primary. He lost the Democratic nomination to Lieutenant Governor John Fetterman, winning only 10.9% of the vote and also losing his home county.

2024 Auditor General campaign 

On March 8, 2023, Kenyatta announced his candidacy to be Pennsylvania's Auditor General. Kenyatta is the first Democrat to announce a bid to challenge the incumbent Auditor General, Timothy DeFoor.

Recognition 
In 2017, Kenyatta was named as one of Philadelphia Magazine's 38 "people we love" as a "neighborhood champ."

Kenyatta was the subject of an award-winning documentary, Going Forward, which followed his 2018 victory.

The Philadelphia Tribune called Kenyatta one of Philadelphia's most influential African-Americans.

In 2020, Kenyatta was named an OUT 100 Honoree by OUT Magazine, their annual list of the most "impactful and influential LGBTQ+ people". In the same year, he was awarded the Sen. Tammy Baldwin Breakthrough Award.

Electoral history

References

External links
 
 Official website for 2022 US Senate campaign

|-

1990 births
2020 United States presidential electors
21st-century American politicians
African-American state legislators in Pennsylvania
Gay politicians
LGBT African Americans
LGBT state legislators in Pennsylvania
Living people
Democratic Party members of the Pennsylvania House of Representatives
Politicians from Philadelphia
Temple University alumni
21st-century African-American politicians
Candidates in the 2022 United States Senate elections